Larsonella pumila is a species of goby native to the Indian Ocean from the coast of Africa to the western Pacific Ocean.  This species grows to a length of  SL.  This species is the only known member of its genus. The specific name honours the ichthyologist Helen K. Larson who was the Curator of Fishes at the Museum and Art Gallery of the Northern Territory in Darwin, for her work on the taxonomy of Indo-Pacific gobies.

References

Gobiidae
Monotypic fish genera
Fish described in 1980
Taxa named by Helen K. Larson
Taxa named by Douglass F. Hoese